Ovchinino (Russian: Овчинино) is a rural locality (a selo) in Nagornoye Rural Settlement, Petushinsky District in Vladimir Oblast. Population: 9 inhabitants (2010). The distance to the town Pokrov is 10,56 mi (17 km) and the distance to the town Petushki is 21,75 mi (35 km). There is Church of St. Nicholas in Ovchinino.

Population

References

Notes

Rural localities in Petushinsky District